Zdeněk Špinar (4 April 1916 – 14 August 1995) was a Czechoslovak paleontologist and author. He was renowned in the field for popularising vertebrate paleontology. He specialised in the paleontology of amphibians, especially anurans. Many of his studies remain heavily cited. He is also known for a scientific collaboration with painter Zdeněk Burian.

Czechoslovak paleontologists
1916 births
1995 deaths